The articular disk (or disc) is a thin, oval plate of fibrocartilage present in several joints which separates synovial cavities. This separation of the cavity space allows for separate movements to occur in each space.

The presence of an articular disk also permits a more even distribution of forces between the articulating surfaces of bones, increases the stability of the joint, and aids in directing the flow of synovial fluid to areas of the articular cartilage that experience the most friction.

The term "meniscus" has a very similar meaning.

Additional images

See also
 Triangular fibrocartilage ("articular disk of the distal radioulnar articulation")
 Articular disk of the temporomandibular joint
 Articular disk of sternoclavicular articulation

References

External links
 
 

Joints